Groups, Geometry, and Dynamics is a quarterly peer-reviewed mathematics journal published quarterly by the European Mathematical Society. It was established in 2007 and covers all aspects of groups, group actions, geometry and dynamical systems. The journal is indexed by Mathematical Reviews and Zentralblatt MATH. Its 2009 MCQ was 0.65, and its 2012 impact factor is 0.867.

External links 

Mathematics journals
Publications established in 2007
English-language journals
European Mathematical Society academic journals
Quarterly journals